Typhlocharis is a genus of ground beetles in the family Carabidae. There are more than 60 described species in Typhlocharis.

Species
These 68 species belong to the genus Typhlocharis:

 Typhlocharis acutangula Perez-Gonzalez & Zaballos, 2013  (Spain)
 Typhlocharis aguirrei Zaballos & Banda, 2001  (Spain)
 Typhlocharis algarvensis Coiffait, 1971  (Portugal)
 Typhlocharis amara Zaballos; Andujar & Perez-Gonzalez, 2016  (Spain)
 Typhlocharis anachoreta Perez-Gonzalez et al., 2018  (Spain)
 Typhlocharis armata Coiffait, 1969  (Spain and Morocco)
 Typhlocharis atienzai Zaballos & Ruiz-Tapiador, 1997  (Spain)
 Typhlocharis baeturica Perez-Gonzalez & Zaballos, 2013  (Spain)
 Typhlocharis bazi Ortuño, 2000  (Spain)
 Typhlocharis belenae Zaballos, 1983  (Spain)
 Typhlocharis besucheti Vigna Taglianti, 1972  (Spain)
 Typhlocharis bivari A.Serrano & Aguiar, 2006  (Portugal)
 Typhlocharis boetica Ehlers, 1883  (Spain)
 Typhlocharis bullaquensis Zaballos & Ruiz-Tapiador, 1997  (Spain)
 Typhlocharis carinata A.Serrano & Aguiar, 2006  (Portugal)
 Typhlocharis carmenae Zaballos & Ruiz-Tapiador, 1995  (Spain)
 Typhlocharis carpetana Zaballos, 1989  (Spain)
 Typhlocharis coenobita Perez-Gonzalez et al., 2018  (Spain)
 Typhlocharis crespoi A.Serrano & Aguiar, 2008  (Portugal)
 Typhlocharis deferreri Zaballos & Perez-Gonzalez, 2011  (Spain)
 Typhlocharis diecki Ehlers, 1883  (Spain)
 Typhlocharis elenae A.Serrano & Aguiar, 2002  (Portugal and Spain)
 Typhlocharis eremita Perez-Gonzalez et al., 2018  (Spain)
 Typhlocharis estrellae Zaballos & Ruiz-Tapiador, 1997  (Spain)
 Typhlocharis fancelloi Magrini, 2000  (Spain)
 Typhlocharis farinosae Zaballos & Ruiz-Tapiador, 1997  (Spain)
 Typhlocharis fozcoaensis A.Serrano & Aguiar, 2005  (Portugal)
 Typhlocharis furnayulensis Zaballos & Banda, 2001  (Spain)
 Typhlocharis gomesalvesi A.Serrano & Aguiar, 2002  (Portugal)
 Typhlocharis gomezi Zaballos, 1992  (Spain)
 Typhlocharis gonzaloi Ortuño, 2005  (Spain)
 Typhlocharis hiekei Zaballos & Farinos, 1995  (Spain)
 Typhlocharis intermedia Zaballos, 1986  (Spain)
 Typhlocharis jeannei Zaballos, 1989  (Spain)
 Typhlocharis josabelae Ortuño & Gilgado, 2011  (Spain)
 Typhlocharis laurentii Magrini, 2000  (Spain)
 Typhlocharis loebli (Perez-Gonzalez & Zaballos, 2018)  (Spain)
 Typhlocharis lunai A.Serrano & Aguiar, 2006  (Portugal and Spain)
 Typhlocharis martini Andujar; Lencina & A.Serrano, 2008  (Spain)
 Typhlocharis matiasi Zaballos & Banda, 2001  (Spain)
 Typhlocharis mendesi A.Serrano & Aguiar, 2017  (Portugal)
 Typhlocharis millenaria Zaballos & Banda, 2001  (Spain)
 Typhlocharis mixta Perez-Gonzalez & Zaballos, 2013  (Spain)
 Typhlocharis monastica Zaballos & Wrase, 1998  (Spain)
 Typhlocharis navarica Zaballos & Wrase, 1998  (Spain)
 Typhlocharis outereloi Novoa, 1978  (Spain)
 Typhlocharis pacensis Zaballos & Jeanne, 1987  (Spain)
 Typhlocharis passosi A.Serrano & Aguiar, 2005  (Portugal)
 Typhlocharis paulinoi A.Serrano & Aguiar, 2006  (Portugal)
 Typhlocharis peregrina Zaballos & Wrase, 1998  (Spain)
 Typhlocharis portilloi Zaballos, 1992  (Spain)
 Typhlocharis prima Perez-Gonzalez & Zaballos, 2013  (Spain)
 Typhlocharis quadridentata (Coiffait, 1969)  (Portugal)
 Typhlocharis quarta Perez-Gonzalez & Zaballos, 2013  (Portugal)
 Typhlocharis rochapitei A.Serrano & Aguiar, 2008  (Portugal)
 Typhlocharis santschii Normand, 1916  (Tunisia)
 Typhlocharis sarrius A.Serrano & Aguiar, 2001  (Portugal)
 Typhlocharis scrofa Perez-Gonzalez & Zaballos, 2013  (Spain)
 Typhlocharis secunda Perez-Gonzalez & Zaballos, 2013  (Spain)
 Typhlocharis silvanoides Dieck, 1869  (Spain and Morocco)
 Typhlocharis simoni Ganglbauer, 1900  (Spain)
 Typhlocharis singularis A.Serrano & Aguiar, 2000  (Portugal)
 Typhlocharis tertia Perez-Gonzalez & Zaballos, 2013  (Spain)
 Typhlocharis tetramera Perez-Gonzalez & Zaballos, 2013  (Spain)
 Typhlocharis toletana Lencina & Andujar, 2010  (Spain)
 Typhlocharis toribioi Ortuño, 1988  (Spain)
 Typhlocharis wrasei Zaballos & Farinos, 1995  (Spain)
 Typhlocharis zaballosi A.Serrano & Aguiar, 2014  (Portugal)

References

Trechinae